A hickey is a mark on the skin caused by amorous contact.

Hickey may also refer to:

Places
 Hickey Run, tributary of the Anacostia River in Washington, D.C., USA
 Hickey Settlement, Ontario, a community in Hastings Highlands, Ontario, Canada
 Hickey-Osborne Block, historic area in Peabody, Massachusetts, USA

People
 Hickey (surname), including list of people with the surname

Arts, entertainment, and media

Films
 Hickey (film), a 2016 coming of age film directed by Alex Grossman
 Hickey & Boggs, 1972 film noir detective movie written by Walter Hill, co-starring and directed by Robert Culp

Other uses in arts, entertainment, and media
 Hickey (band)
 Hickey's Bengal Gazette, first printed newspaper to be published in the Indian sub-continent

Other uses
 Hickey, a placeholder name, shortened form of doohickey
 Hickey College, private career college in St. Louis, Missouri, USA
Hickey Freeman, manufacturer of suits for men and boys, based in Rochester, New York, USA
 Hickey plot, a rumored plot to kill George Washington involving executed soldier Thomas Hickey